Balintore is a village in Angus, Scotland. It lies in Glen Isla, four miles north of the Loch of Lintrathen and seven miles west of Kirriemuir. Approximately half a mile to the east is Knowehead of Auldallan farm, where there can be found a pair of uninscribed standing stones.

References

Villages in Angus, Scotland